The 2017–18 season is Beitar Jerusalem 81st season since its establishment in 1936, and 70th since the establishment of the State of Israel. During the 2017–18 campaign the club have competed in the Israeli Premier League, State Cup, Toto Cup,  UEFA Europa League.
In the end of the previous season the association of Israeli football decide that The owner Tabib can't manage the team for 2 years, because his involvement in criminal case. In 28 May the owner Eli Tabib announced the joining of the biggest legend of Beitar Eli Ohana to the chairman. Within the preparations of the season, Beitar signed the players: Georginho, Amir Agayev, Zion Tzemah, Miki Siroshtein, Gaëtan Varenne, Or Va'aknin, and the one of the successful Israeli players of all times Yossi Benayoun.

Current squad

Transfers

Summer

In:

Out:

Winter

In:

Out:

Pre-season and friendlies

Competitions

Ligat Ha'Al

Results

League table

Top playoff

Top playoff table

UEFA Europe League

First qualifying round

Second qualifying round

State Cup

Toto Cup

Group stage

Knockout stage

Notes

References

Beitar Jerusalem F.C. seasons
Beitar Jerusalem